Hampton Senior High School is an Independent public co-educational  high day school, located in the Perth suburb of Morley, Western Australia.

History

In August 1965, the Department of Education announced that a school would open in Hampton in 1966 to reduce overcrowding at Governor Stirling, Cyril Jackson and John Forrest Senior High Schools. Hampton Senior High School opened in February 1966, but the school had not been completed yet. Two classrooms at Middle Swan Primary School and five at Midland Technical School were used by the school for the first term of 1966. Students were transported by bus to other facilities to do home economics and design and technology.

In term two, the school's buildings were complete and so the school moved in.

The school is named after John Hampton, the Governor of Western Australia from 1862 to 1868.

In 1986, the school first started its dance program. In 1991, the school held its 25th year reunion. An aerial photo was taken of all the staff and students on the oval.

Hampton Senior High School became an Independent Public School in 2015.

Programs

Hampton Senior High Schools has Department of Education endorsed specialist programs in cheer dance, information and communication technology (ICT) and performing arts. Hampton Senior High School is also one of only two schools offering a Gifted and Talented Dance program in Western Australia.

Local intake area

Hampton Senior High School's local intake area covers parts of Bassendean, Bayswater, Eden Hill, Embleton, Kiara, Morley and Noranda. Students living in the local intake area have a guaranteed place at the school if they apply. Students applying from outside the local intake area will be accepted on a case-by-case basis.

Academic results

Student numbers
In the school's first year, it had 266 students. Its peak student population was 1,534, in 1973.

List of principals

Notable alumni

Brad Campbell – Member of the band Gyroscope
Ebbeny Faranda – Journalist for Nine News
Alisha Farrer – Actress and model
Nigel Hallett – Politician
Narelda Jacobs – Journalist and presenter for Network 10
Samantha Jade – ARIA Award winning singer, winner of the fourth season of ''The X Factor Australia
Renee Lim – Actress and doctor
Zoran Trivic – Member of the band Gyroscope

See also

 List of schools in the Perth metropolitan area

References

Public high schools in Perth, Western Australia
Educational institutions established in 1966
1966 establishments in Australia
Morley, Western Australia